Liam Henderson (born 25 April 1996) is a Scottish professional footballer who plays as a midfielder for Serie A club Empoli.

Henderson joined Celtic as a youth and progressed through the club's development squad before making his competitive first team debut in December 2013. He played in Celtic's winning 2015 Scottish League Cup Final team, before going out on three-month loan to Tippeligaen side Rosenborg. The Norwegian club went on to win a domestic league and cup double, and Henderson played enough games for him to earn winner's medals in both competitions. He then went on loan to Hibernian for most of the 2015–16 season, helping the club win the 2015–16 Scottish Cup. Henderson then rejoined the Celtic squad, but made few first-team appearances.

He was transferred to Serie B club Bari in January 2018, then moved to Hellas Verona as a free agent a few months later after Bari were declared bankrupt. He helped Verona to promotion, and in August 2019 became the first Scot to play in a Serie A match since Graeme Souness in 1986.

Henderson has represented Scotland at various youth levels, including captaining the under-17 team.

Club career
Henderson started his football career with Broxburn Athletic F.C. before joining Celtic.

Celtic

2013–14: First team debut
Henderson signed for Celtic in 2008. He featured for the club's development squad in midfield and was included in the first team squad for their pre-season trip to Germany in the summer of 2013.  Henderson played in a pre-season game against Ukrainian side Sevastopol, alongside higher profile debutants Virgil van Dijk and Amido Balde.

Season 2013–14 saw Henderson continue to play for the Celtic development squad at both under-20 level and in the UEFA Youth League.  He was particularly impressive in Celtic's 4–1 win over the Ajax academy side in October. Henderson made his competitive first team début, aged 17, on 6 December 2013; coming on as a substitute in Celtic's 5–0 win over Motherwell in the league. He then featured for the first team again in January 2014, playing in Turkey against Galatasaray in the Antalya Winter Cup. The match finished 0–0, but Celtic lost on penalty kicks. Despite the result, Henderson, and several other youth players who featured, were praised for their performance.

On 13 March 2014, Henderson made his first start in a competitive game in an away league match at Kilmarnock. Celtic won 3–0 and Henderson was praised by manager Neil Lennon for his performance, saying "I thought he grew into the game and had a superb debut. Credit to him and credit to the academy, because I think we have got a good player there." Henderson scored his first goal for Celtic on 26 March 2014, the second goal in Celtic's 5–1 win away at Partick Thistle which clinched the league title. His form throughout March saw him win the SPFL Young Player of the Month award for that month. Manager Neil Lennon commented "He's been absolutely excellent", and added that "His attitude to work is fantastic and there's certainly a willingness on his part to get better".

2014–15: Loan to Rosenborg
Henderson made a couple of appearances in the first few weeks of season 2014–15; playing against KR Reykjavik in a Champions League qualifying match and then in a league match away against Inverness CT. However, he thereafter completely dropped out of new Celtic manager Ronny Deila's plans for several months. Henderson regained his place in the XI in early January and scored an excellent left-footed strike against Hamilton Academical on 17 January 2015. Henderson featured for Celtic in the first leg of their Europa League tie against Inter Milan, coming on as a substitute in the second half and providing the cross which led to John Guidetti's late equalising goal in a 3–3 draw. A month later he played in the final eight minutes of Celtic's 2–0 League Cup Final win over Dundee United.

Henderson completed a short-term loan move to Norwegian club Rosenborg on 31 March 2015. Rosenborg manager Kåre Ingebrigtsen described Henderson as a "very exciting player" and that he had "huge potential". Henderson made his debut for his new club on 12 April when he came on as a second-half substitute during a 6–0 win over Haugesund. After making another substitute appearance in a league match against Strømsgodset, Henderson made his first starting appearance in Norway on 22 April in a Norwegian Cup tie away against lower league Vuku. The midfielder opened the scoring after 8 minutes with a right foot strike. It was his first goal for Rosenborg, and his side went on to win 3–0. On 25 April Henderson came off the bench, on his 19th birthday, against Viking to score twice within 10 minutes. Rosenborg subsequently won the game 4–1. After making a total of 13 appearances, he returned to Celtic at the end of June 2015. Henderson was positive about his time in Norway, stating "it was a great experience, playing in a different league and in a foreign country."

Rosenborg clinched the league title on 25 October 2015, with Henderson having made enough league appearances to win a league medal. He also qualified for a cup winner's medal after Rosenborg won the 2015 Norwegian Football Cup. Henderson qualified for a medal by playing in the earlier rounds of the competition, with rules in Norway stating a player is eligible for a medal by virtue of playing during the cup run.

2015–16: Loan to Hibernian
On 14 August 2015, Henderson signed a three-year contract with Celtic.
 At the same time he moved on loan to Hibernian. He made his Hibs debut the following day, coming on as a second-half substitute during a 1–0 win in the league against Morton at Easter Road. On 12 September, he scored for his first goal for Hibs, opening the scoring in a 3–0 win over Alloa Athletic. A week later, Henderson scored the only goal in a 1–0 win away at Livingston. He curled the ball in direct from a free kick, with manager Alan Stubbs describing the goal as "worthy of winning any game". On 30 January 2016, Hibernian defeated St Johnstone 2–1 in the semi-final of the Scottish League Cup. The opening goal was controversial; Henderson adjudged to have been fouled by St Johnstone's Chris Millar in the penalty box, with Jason Cummings converting the resultant penalty. The penalty award provoked fury from the St Johnstone players, who felt that Henderson had dived. Henderson played in the final against Ross County, but Hibs lost 2–1, with the winning goal scored by The Staggies in the 90th minute.

Hibs were paired against Edinburgh derby rivals Hearts in the fifth round of the 2015–16 Scottish Cup, coming from two goals down at Tynecastle to salvage a replay, then winning 1–0 at Easter Road to progress to the quarter-final. Henderson was a prominent player in both games. Hibs defeated Inverness CT 2–1 in the next round, with Henderson heavily involved in the move that lead to Hibs' second goal. Henderson came off the bench in the 2016 Scottish Cup Final, as Hibernian beat Rangers 3–2 to win the competition for the first time since 1902. On as a 70th-minute substitute, Henderson delivered both corner kicks that led to Anthony Stokes' equaliser (2–2) and David Gray's stoppage time winning goal.

2016–17: Return to Celtic
Under new Celtic manager, Brendan Rodgers, Henderson barely featured at all Celtic during the early part of season 2016–17, only finally making his first starting appearance of the season on 15 October 2016 in a 2–0 win over Motherwell in the league. His appearances continued to be sporadic, and by the end of the season he had only made six starts, with a further seven substitute appearances to bring his total to 13 games. His 10 games in the league were enough, however, to clinch him a league championship medal.

2017–18
The following season saw Henderson even further down the pecking order for a place in the team. By January 2018, his only first team football of the season was a 23-minute second-half substitute appearance against Dundee in October 2017. With no realistic hope of progressing his career at Celtic, Henderson went on trial with Italian club Bari.

Bari
On 17 January 2018, Henderson completed a move to Serie B outfit Bari in January 2018 for an undisclosed fee, later reported as being £115,000. He made his debut on 28 January, playing for the first hour in a 4–0 defeat at home to Empoli in the league. On 24 February, he scored his first goal for Bari, the opening goal in a 2–1 win over Ternana, and provided the assist for Luca Marrone's winning goal in the second half.

Bari were declared bankrupt at the end of the season, and in July 2018 it was being reported that Henderson had agreed to move to Verona.

Hellas Verona
On 3 August 2018, Henderson signed a four-year contract with Serie B side Hellas Verona. He had become a free agent after his previous club Bari were declared bankrupt. Verona made a strong start to the season, winning their opening five games, with Henderson scoring his first goal for the club in a 2–1 win over Crotone on 22 September 2018. Manager Fabio Grosso praised Henderson for his play in the early months of the season, highlighting his versatility and the "timing of his runs into the [penalty] box". Verona were promoted to Serie A in June 2019 by winning the Serie B promotion playoffs.

Henderson played in Verona's opening match of the 2019–20 Serie A season, a 1–1 draw with Bologna. This appearance made him the first Scot to play in a Serie A match since Graeme Souness with Sampdoria in 1986.

Loan to Empoli
On 17 January 2020, he joined Serie B club Empoli on loan with an option to buy.

Lecce
On 11 September 2020, Henderson signed a four-year contract with Lecce.

Return to Empoli
After just one season with Lecce, Henderson returned to Empoli.

International career
Henderson has played for Scotland at youth level; captaining the under-17 side, and then making the step up to the under-19 side who qualified for the Elite Round of the UEFA European Championship after a 1–1 draw with Germany in October 2013.  Henderson played in all three elite round matches in May 2014, although Scotland finished bottom of the group and failed to progress.

He kept his place in the under-19 squad for the following season, and in October 2014 played against Finland in the opening qualifying tie for the 2015 UEFA European Under-19 Championship. Henderson scored from the penalty spot to put Scotland 2–0 ahead, but Finland rallied and scored twice in the final 14 minutes to secure a draw. Henderson played in further draws against Lithuania and Norway, with Scotland qualifying for Elite Round as the best ranked third-placed team. He scored both of Scotland's goals in their 2–1 win over Austria in their opening Elite Round match on 26 March 2015. Henderson missed the next Elite Round match against Italy, but returned for the final game on 31 March against Croatia. Scotland could only draw 1–1, and failed to qualify from the group.

In November 2015, Henderson was called up to the under-21 squad for a European Under-21 Championship Qualifier against Ukraine at St Mirren Park, Paisley. On 13 November, he played for the whole 90 minutes in a 2–2 draw with the Ukrainians, twice coming close to scoring himself. Over the next year, Henderson played in a further seven U21 internationals, although was on the winning side only once. His last match for the Under 21 side was on 28 March 2017, when he captained the side in a scoreless draw against Estonia in a friendly in Paisley.

Personal life
Henderson's father, Nicky, was also a professional footballer in the 1990s and early 2000s. His younger brother Ewan, who also came through the Celtic youth system and made his first-team debut in May 2018, currently plays for Hibernian.

Career statistics

Honours
Celtic
 Scottish Premiership: 2016–17
 Scottish League Cup: 2014–15

Rosenborg
 Tippeligaen: 2015
 Norwegian Football Cup: 2015

Hibernian
 Scottish Cup: 2015–16

References

External links

1996 births
Living people
Sportspeople from Livingston, West Lothian
Scottish footballers
Association football midfielders
Scotland youth international footballers
Scotland under-21 international footballers
Scottish Professional Football League players
Eliteserien players
Serie A players
Serie B players
Celtic F.C. players
Rosenborg BK players
Hibernian F.C. players
S.S.C. Bari players
Hellas Verona F.C. players
Empoli F.C. players
U.S. Lecce players
Scottish expatriate footballers
Scottish expatriate sportspeople in Norway
Expatriate footballers in Norway
Scottish expatriate sportspeople in Italy
Expatriate footballers in Italy
Footballers from West Lothian